Al-Funduq was a Palestinian village in the Qalqilya Governorate in the northeastern West Bank, located east of Qalqilya. According to the Palestinian Central Bureau of Statistics, the village had a population of approximately 659 inhabitants in mid-year 2006. The village took its name from one Arabic word for "inn."

In 2012 it was decided that Jinsafut and Al-Funduq should be merged under one local council.

Location
It is bordered by Immatin to the east, Deir Istiya to the south, Wadi Qana (in Salfit Governorate) to the west and Hajja to the north.

History

Byzantine period
Ceramics from the Byzantine era have been found here, and it has been suggested that this was the place Fondeka, once inhabited by Samaritans.

Crusader period
During the Crusader period the village was inhabited by Muslims, according to the historian Diya al-Din al-Maqdisi. A Hanbali scholar named Ahmad ibn Abd al-Daim al-Maqaddasi al-Hanbali was born in the village in 575 AH/1180 CE, dying there in 668 AH/March 1270 CE. Followers of the Hanbali scholar Ibn Qudamah (1146/47-1223) also lived in the village, and during this period al-Funduq was home to a well-known Muslim sheikh named Abd Allah.

Ottoman period
The place appeared in 1596 Ottoman tax registers as Funduq, being in the Nahiya of Bani Sa'b of the Liwa of Nablus. It had a population of 86 households, all Muslim. They paid a fixed tax-rate of 33.3% on agricultural products, including wheat, barley, summer crops, olives, goats and beehives, and a press for olives or grapes, in addition to occasional revenues and a fixed sum for people of the Nablus area; a total of 10,500 akçe.

A map from Napoleon's invasion of 1799 by Pierre Jacotin named it Fondouk, as a village by the road from Jaffa to Nablus.

In 1838 Robinson noted el-Funduk as a village in Beni Sa'ab district, west of Nablus.

In 1870 Victor Guérin noted El-Fondouk from Fara'ata, but did not visit it.

In 1882, the PEF's Survey of Western Palestine described the village as "a small poor village by the main road, with wells to the north and two sacred places; it stands on high ground," and located in the Beni Sab district.

British Mandate
In the 1922 census of Palestine conducted by the British Mandate authorities, Funduq had a population of 66 inhabitants, all Muslims, increasing in the 1931 census to 72 Muslims, with 21 houses.

In the 1945 census El Funduq had a population was 100 Muslims, with 1,619 dunams of land, according to an official land and population survey. Of this, 43 dunams were for plantations or irrigated land, 1,026 for cereals, while 14 dunams were built-up (urban) land.

Jordanian period
In the wake of the 1948 Arab–Israeli War, and after the 1949 Armistice Agreements, Al-Funduq came under Jordanian rule.

The Jordanian census of 1961 found 137 inhabitants in Al-Funduq.

Post-1967
Since the Six-Day War in 1967, Al-Funduq has been under Israeli occupation.

After the 1995 accords, 4.8% of Jinsafut and Al-Funduq land was classified as Area B, the remaining 95.2% as Area C.

References

Bibliography

 (Avi Yonah, 1976, p. 89)

 
 
 ("a ruin with Iron II pottery"; citing a 1972 Hebrew source.)
 

 
 
 (several mentions)

External links
Welcome To al-Funduq
Funduk, Welcome to Palestine
Survey of Western Palestine, Map 11: IAA, Wikimedia commons 
Jinsafut Village (including Al Funduq Locality) (Fact Sheet), Applied Research Institute–Jerusalem (ARIJ)
Jinsafut Village Profile (including Al Funduq Locality), ARIJ
Jinsafut, aerial photo, ARIJ

Qalqilya Governorate
Villages in the West Bank
Municipalities of the State of Palestine
Ancient Samaritan settlements